Games held by the National Basketball League (NBL) on Boxing Day, December 26, have been an annual tradition since the league's 21st season in 1998.

Results

Boxing Day standings

See also

 National Basketball League (Australia)

References

National Basketball League (Australia)
Recurring sporting events established in 1998
1998 establishments in Australia
Boxing Day